is a professional Go player.

Biography
Tetsuya became a professional go player in 1976. He was promoted to 9 dan in 1986. He holds the record of fastest promotion from 1 dan to 9 dan in the Kansai Ki-in. Tetsuya has been runner up twice, once in the NHK Cup in 1995, and in the Shinjin-O in 1980. He resides in Osaka, Japan.

Runners-up

Promotion record

Awards
Kansai Ki-in Best Player Award one time.
Dougen Prize winner three times.
Fields and Mountains Prize one time.
Kansai Ki-in Best Newcomer Award one time.

References

External links
 Kansai Ki-in profile 

1961 births
Japanese Go players
Living people
People from Miyazaki Prefecture